Glomeris is largely European genus of pill millipedes. It contains over 100 species, distributed across Europe, but also extending into the Canary Islands, Turkey, and eleven species from North Africa.

Species

 Glomeris albida
 Glomeris albidonigra
 Glomeris alluaudi
 Glomeris annulata
 Glomeris aurita
 Glomeris balcanica
 Glomeris bicolor
 Glomeris bimaculata
 Glomeris bureschi
 Glomeris carpathica
 Glomeris castanea
 Glomeris cingulata
 Glomeris connexa
 Glomeris contraria
 Glomeris crassitarsis
 Glomeris dalmatina
 Glomeris dionysii
 Glomeris distichella
 Glomeris dorsosanguine
 Glomeris esterelana
 Glomeris euganeorum
 Glomeris flavolimbata
 Glomeris flavomaculata
 Glomeris formosa
 Glomeris fuscomarmorata
 Glomeris genuensis
 Glomeris gomerana
 Glomeris guttata
 Glomeris helvetica
 Glomeris hexasticha
 Glomeris hispanica
 Glomeris humbertiana
 Glomeris ibizana
 Glomeris inferorum
 Glomeris infuscata
 Glomeris infuscatus
 Glomeris intermedia
 Glomeris interrupta
 Glomeris irrorata
 Glomeris iudicaria
 Glomeris judicaria
 Glomeris klugii
 Glomeris kubana
 Glomeris larii
 Glomeris latemarginata
 Glomeris lepida
 Glomeris ligurica
 Glomeris limbata
 Glomeris longaronensis
 Glomeris lugubris
 Glomeris lunatosignata
 Glomeris lusitana
 Glomeris maculata
 Glomeris maculosa
 Glomeris maerens
 Glomeris malmivaga
 Glomeris marginata
 Glomeris marmorata
 Glomeris norica
 Glomeris numidia
 Glomeris obsoleta
 Glomeris occidentalis
 Glomeris occultocolorata
 Glomeris ornata
 Glomeris oropensis
 Glomeris pachytelopoda
 Glomeris perplexa
 Glomeris pielachiana
 Glomeris plumbea
 Glomeris primordialis
 Glomeris primoridialis
 Glomeris prominens
 Glomeris pulchra
 Glomeris pustulata
 Glomeris quadrifasciata
 Glomeris quadripunctata
 Glomeris romana
 Glomeris rugifera
 Glomeris sanguinicolor
 Glomeris saussurei
 Glomeris schubarti
 Glomeris sinensis
 Glomeris solis
 Glomeris stammeri
 Glomeris stellifera
 Glomeris strasseri
 Glomeris sublimbata
 Glomeris tetrasticha
 Glomeris transalpina
 Glomeris tridentina
 Glomeris zonata

References

External links

Glomerida
Millipedes of Africa
Millipedes of Europe